Dragontooth may refer to:

 BLU-43 Dragontooth, an air-dropped, cluster-type land mine
 Dragontooth: The Prequel, a 2009 horror novel
 Dragontooth Organization, a fictional vigilante organization

See also
 Dragon's teeth (disambiguation)